A Friendship for Today is a 2007 book by Patricia McKissack about the life of a girl, Rosemary Patterson, attending one of the first integrated Missouri schools during the 1950s.

Reception
School Library Journal, in its review of A Friendship for Today, found it "A wealth of historical references, from civil rights to polio vaccine to early TV, is embedded in the narrative." and concluded "Readers will enjoy the protagonist's spunky, resilient response to adversity and her candid, often amusing observations of human nature." and Booklist wrote "McKissack's insights into the two steps forward . . . one giant step back nature of the civil rights struggle are valuable, whether children encounter them on their own or in a classroom, where the novel will poignantly extend character education and history curricula."

A Friendship for Today has also been reviewed by The Horn Book Magazine, Kirkus Reviews, Library Media Connection, Multicultural Review, and Publishers Weekly.

Awards
2008 CCBC Choice
2009-10 Mark Twain Award - nominee
2009-10 William Allen White Children's Book Award - nominee
2011 Rebecca Caudill Young Readers' Book Award - nominee

References

2007 children's books
American children's novels
American historical novels
Novels set in Missouri
1950s in Missouri
Children's historical novels
Fiction set in the 1950s
2005 American novels
Books by Patricia McKissack